St. John's Lutheran Church, also known as Old Dutch Church, was a historic Lutheran church located near Ellettsville, Monroe County, Indiana.  It was a one-story, log building sheathed in yellow poplar siding. It has been demolished.

It was listed on the National Register of Historic Places in 1982 and removed in 1991.

References

Former National Register of Historic Places in Indiana
Lutheran churches in Indiana
Churches on the National Register of Historic Places in Indiana
Churches completed in 1836
Buildings and structures in Monroe County, Indiana
National Register of Historic Places in Monroe County, Indiana